Electric Honey is the third studio album by Luscious Jackson, released on June 29, 1999, by Grand Royal. It peaked at number 102 on the Billboard 200 chart, as well as number 99 on the UK Albums Chart.

Track listing
All songs written by Jill Cunniff, except tracks 5, 7, 10, 12 and 14, by Gabrielle Glaser.

"Nervous Breakthrough" – 3:47
"Ladyfingers" – 3:27
"Christine" – 3:30
"Alien Lover" – 3:50
"Summer Daze" – 3:31
"Sexy Hypnotist" – 3:14
"Friends" – 3:30
"Devotion" – 3:14
"Fantastic Fabulous" (featuring Deborah Harry) – 3:14
"Gypsy" – 3:01
"Beloved" – 2:58
"Country's a Callin'" – 3:10
"Space Diva" – 3:25
"Fly" – 4:17
"Lover's Moon" – 1:53

Personnel 
Luscious Jackson
Jill Cunniff – vocals (tracks 1–4, 6, 8, 9, 11, 13, 15), guitar (1–3, 6, 8, 9, 11, 13, 15), bass guitar (1–9, 11, 13), keyboards (4, 6), backing vocals (10, 12), space opera (13)
Gabrielle Glaser – rap vocals (1, 4), keyboards (1, 7, 10), guitar (4, 5, 7, 10, 12–14), vocals (5, 7, 10, 12, 14), keyboard strings (5), piano (7, 10), lead guitar (9), backing vocals (9, 13), bass guitar (10, 12), drum programming (12), mellotron (14)
Kate Schellenbach – percussion (1), drums (3, 4, 6–14)

Additional musicians

Tia Sprocket – percussion (1), backing vocals (5, 7, 14), finger snaps (14)
Robert Aaron – horns (1, 6), flute (5, 6)
Tony Mangurian – programming (1–3, 6, 11), vocals (2), backing vocals (5, 7), drum programming (5), additional drums (7), guitar (11), piano (11), keyboards (2), "Jalfrazi guy" (10)
Emmylou Harris – backing vocals (2, 12)
G. Wise – talkbox (2)
N'Dea Davenport – ghost vocals (3)
Daniel Lanois – slide guitar (3)
Alex Young – DJ (3, 9)
Mickey Petralia – programming (4, 8)
Roger Manning – additional keyboards (4, 8)
Danny Frankel – percussion (4, 8)
Kym Hampton – backing vocals (7)
Diane Friedewald – backing vocals (7)
Irene Bremis – backing vocals (7)
Sean Raynor – backing vocals (7)
Deborah Harry – guest vocals (9)
Lisa Haney – strings (9)
25 Ton – programming (13)
Petra Haden – violin (13, 15)
Josephine Wiggs – cello (13), upright bass (14)
Vincent Louis – percussion (14)

Technical

Andy Wallace – mixing
Jamey Staub – mixing (4, 8, 13–15)
Steve Sisco – assistant engineer
Tony Mangurian – co-producer (1, 2, 5–7, 10–12), engineer (2)
Jill Cunniff – co-producer (1, 2, 4, 6, 8, 9, 11, 13, 15)
Serge Tsai – engineer (1, 3, 5–7, 10–12)
Mickey Petralia – co-producer (4, 8)
Phil Painson – assistant engineer (4, 8, 13)
Danny Madorsky – assistant engineer (4, 8, 13)
Robert Carranza – additional engineering (4)
Gabrielle Glaser – co-producer (5, 7, 10, 12, 14)
Jaime Candiloro – additional engineering (7)
Tony Visconti – co-producer (9), engineer (9)
Juan Garcia – additional engineering (9), assistant engineer (14)
25 Ton – co-producer (13, 14)
Prince Strickland III – assistant engineer (13, 15)
Alex Kyriazsis – additional engineering (13)
Howie Weinberg – mastering
Danny Clinch – cover, back cover and equipment photography
Susan Alzner – Kate drum photo
Jeremy Creamer – Jill bass photo
Tommy Grimm – Gabby live guitar photo
Parents – kid photos
Orb Acton – country photo
Gabriel Trujillo – hair, make-up
Jeffrey Fernandez – styling
Bill McMullen – art direction, design

Charts

References

External links
 

1999 albums
Albums produced by Mickey Petralia
Albums produced by Tony Visconti
Grand Royal albums
Luscious Jackson albums